John Miller Baer (March 29, 1886 – February 18, 1970) was a U.S. Representative from North Dakota.

Early years and education
Born at Black Creek, Wisconsin, Baer was the son of Capt. John M. Baer and Libbie Riley Baer. His ancestors on the maternal side were the two families Riley and Swing. From the original family of the former descended the poet and humorist, James Whitcomb Riley, and from the latter, the philosopher and preacher. Prof. David Swing, of Chicago. Baer was also a descendant of the Blairs, an old and favorably known family of Southern Ohio.

Baer attended the public schools of his town. He was graduated from Lawrence University, Appleton, Wisconsin, in 1909.

Career
He moved to Golden Valley County, North Dakota, in 1909 and engaged as a civil engineer and in agricultural pursuits from 1909–1915 and served as Postmaster of Beach, North Dakota.

Baer also worked as a cartoonist and furnished cartoons and articles to newspapers. Baer worked for the Non-Partisan Leader from 1909 to 1917. After resigning as postmaster, Baer relocated to Fargo and cartooned for the Fargo Courier-News.

Baer was elected as a member of the Nonpartisan League to the Sixty-fifth Congress by special election, to fill the vacancy caused by the death of United States Representative Henry T. Helgesen, and reelected to the succeeding Congress (August 10, 1917 – March 3, 1921).
He served as chairman of the Committee on Expenditures in the Department of Agriculture (Sixty-sixth Congress).
He was an unsuccessful candidate for reelection to the Sixty-seventh Congress in 1920. He resumed activities as a cartoonist and journalist for Labor, the newspaper of the National Railroad Union.

He died in Washington, D.C., on February 18, 1970. He was interred in Gate of Heaven Cemetery, Silver Spring, Maryland.

Sources

References

Attribution

External links

 
Billy Ireland Cartoon Library & Museum Art Database

1886 births
1970 deaths
People from Black Creek, Wisconsin
Nonpartisan League members of the United States House of Representatives
People from Golden Valley County, North Dakota
Lawrence University alumni
North Dakota postmasters
American cartoonists
Republican Party members of the United States House of Representatives from North Dakota
Burials at Gate of Heaven Cemetery (Silver Spring, Maryland)
20th-century American politicians